Siro Marcellini (born 16 September 1921) is an Italian director and screenwriter.

Born  in Genzano di Roma, Marcellini started his career as a theater director before moving to films, where he first worked as an assistant director. He directed eleven films between 1953 and 1970, also writing the screenplays for several of them.

Selected filmography  
  
 Devil's Cavaliers (1959)
 The Two Rivals (1960)
 The Secret Mark of D'Artagnan (1962)
 The Beast of Babylon Against the Son of Hercules (1964)
 Man of the Cursed Valley (1964)
 Lola Colt (1967)
 Gangster's Law (1969)

References

External links 
 

 

1921 births
Possibly living people
People from Genzano di Roma
20th-century Italian people 
Italian film directors
Italian theatre directors
Italian screenwriters
Italian male screenwriters